Hrovat is a Slovene surname. It is a variation of Horvat, which is the second most common surname in Slovenia. It is derived from the word Hrvat (archaically Horvat), which means a Croat. The surname may refer to:

 Andy Hrovat, American freestyle wrestler
 Meta Hrovat, Slovenian alpine skier
 Nathan Hrovat, Australian football player
 Urška Hrovat, Slovenian skier

References

See also
 
 Hrovatin/Hrvatin (Italianized to Crevatin), a surname common in Slovenian Istria and the Slovenian Littoral
 Hrvatini, a village on the Slovenian coast

Slovene-language surnames
Ethnonymic surnames